An extremist is a proponent of extremism.

Extremist may also refer to:
Political fringe movements
The Extremists (professional wrestling), a professional wrestling tag team 
Extremists (comics), a team of supervillains in DC Comics Justice League titles
The Extremist (comics), a four-issue comic book mini-series
Extremist (album), Demon Hunter album
The Extremist, Joe Satriani album and title track